Newark and Sherwood Concert Band (NSCB) is a community concert band (also known as a wind band) in Nottinghamshire and regularly performs throughout the county and beyond, and in 2019 playing in Emmendingen, Germany. Newark and Sherwood Concert Band has its home in Newark-on-Trent, Nottinghamshire in the East Midlands.  It is independent. The band draws on a diversity of musical styles, from classical transcriptions to contemporary compositions and from film and show compilations to big band favourites.  It has in excess of 50 regular members.

In 2019, NSCB launched Newark and Sherwood Development Band whose membership is made up of younger players and adult learners.

History

Established in 1997 by Caroline Noble as Newark and Sherwood Concert Band.  It started as the Newark and Sherwood College and Community Orchestra, but disbanded after a short period of time.  Noble changed the format to a concert/wind band and it has grown since then having approximately 60 members, performing around the UK and abroad.

In 2009 the band was awarded a grant by the Lottery funded 'Awards for All' programme, which enabled it to buy a comprehensive range of percussion instruments and other items of equipment.

Since January 2013 the band has been led by Conductor and Musical Director Colum J O'Shea.

In 2019, NSCB was awarded a Platinum Award at the National Concert Band Festival.

Robert Jenrick, the Member of Parliament for Newark-on-Trent was President of the band between June 2014 and June 2016.  The current president is Mrs Rita Crowe, who was Mayor of Newark 2017-2018.

Tony Marriott (and until his death Geoffrey Foulds) were patrons of the Band after October 2014.

Performances 
The Band has a programme of formal evening concerts, and a summer season of outdoor engagements. Appearances have included:

 Newark Town Hall
 Collingham Show
 Upton Fete
 Nottinghamshire Agricultural Show
 Newark Brass Explosion
 Newark Riverside Festival
 The Palace Theatre, Newark

Members
Band membership stands currently at over 50 musicians, who come from across Nottinghamshire and adjacent counties. They range in age from 8 to 80-plus.

External links
Newark and Sherwood Concert Band official website

Musical groups from Nottinghamshire
Newark-on-Trent
Concert bands
Wind bands